Catoprion is a genus of serrasalmids from tropical South America, including the basins of the Amazon, Essequibo, Orinoco and Paraguay rivers. It was believed to be a monotypic genus until the 2020 description of C. absconditus.

Species 
There are 2 described species:

 Catoprion mento 
 Catoprion absconditus

References 

Serrasalmidae
Ray-finned fish genera
Taxa named by Johannes Peter Müller
Taxa named by Franz Hermann Troschel